Macrotarsipus albipunctus is a moth of the family Sesiidae. It was described by George Hampson in 1893 and is known from Myanmar and central Vietnam. There are also records from Kenya and Malawi.

The wingspan is 22–24 mm.

References

Sesiidae
Moths of Africa
Moths described in 1893